The Benhisa inscription, CIS I 124, is Punic funeral inscription found in Malta in 1761. It mentions the name Hannibal, which garnered significant scholarly interest.

It is engraved on a block of stone measuring approximately 26 cm x 26 cm, containing four lines of which the end is missing (the left part was broken on its transfer to Paris).

It was sent to Paris in 1810 and it remains in the Cabinet des Médailles of the National Library.

Discovery
The inscription was discovered in the region of Bengħisa (archaically spelt Benhisa), just south of Birżebbuġa, at the south-eastern tip of the island. It was found in a cave-vault with whitewashed walls, dug in a rock, the stone on which was engraved the text in Phoenician characters in a niche carved in the rock, in the interior part of the cave, where also lay a corpse, near which a lamp had been discovered.

Publications
Multiple sketches were published:
  (pages 198-199 and 465–466)
 Ciantar's copy was studied by Jean-Jacques Barthélémy, the decipherer of Phoenician, in Journal des Savants, December 1761, p. 871-872
 Swinton, John. “An Attempt to Explain a Punic Inscription, Lately Discovered in the Island of Malta. In a Letter to the Reverend Thomas Birch, D. D. Secret. R. S. from the Reverend John Swinton, B. D. of Christ-Church, Oxon. F. R. S. and Member of the Etruscan Academy of Cortona in Tuscany.” Philosophical Transactions (1683-1775) 53 (1763): 274–93. http://www.jstor.org/stable/105734.
  (pages 293 and p. 318 in the 1784 edition)
 

It does not appear in the Kanaanäische und Aramäische Inschriften or Cooke's Text-Book of North-Semitic Inscriptions.

Bibliography
 An Eye for Form

References

Punic inscriptions
Archaeological discoveries in Malta
Phoenician steles
Archaeological artifacts